An XML denial-of-service attack (XDoS attack) is a content-borne denial-of-service attack whose purpose is to shut down a web service or system running that service.  A common XDoS attack occurs when an XML message is sent with a multitude of digital signatures and a naive parser would look at each signature and use all the CPU cycles, eating up all resources.  These are less common than inadvertent XDoS attacks which occur when a programming error by a trusted customer causes a handshake to go into an infinite loop.

See also
 Denial-of-service attack
 Application layer DDoS attack
 Billion laughs
 Command and control (malware)
 DDoS mitigation
 Fork bomb
 High Orbit Ion Cannon (HOIC)
 Hit-and-run DDoS
 Industrial espionage
 Infinite loop
 Intrusion detection system
 Low Orbit Ion Cannon (LOIC)
 Network intrusion detection system
 ReDoS
 SlowDroid
 Slowloris (computer security)
 Zombie (computer science)

XML